= Desoxyribonucleate =

"Desoxyribonucleic acid" and "desoxyribonucleate" are archaic terms for DNA, deoxyribonucleic acid, and its salts, respectively. The terms are used in this sense in various classic papers in genetics, such as Avery, MacLeod, and McCarty (1944).
